Osman Kürşat Duman (born March 13, 1987) is a Turkish professional footballer. He currently plays for Yalovaspor.

Career
Fenerbahçe transferred Duman when he was fifteen years old. He made his debut for the club on November 11, 2006, in a Turkish Cup match against Sivasspor. He was brought on in the 88th minute.

Duman played 54 times for Fenerbahçe PAF and 2 times for Turkey U17.

Honours
Süper Lig (1): 2006–07

External links
Official Fenerbahçe Youth Team Page
Player Profile at TFF.org

1987 births
Living people
Fenerbahçe S.K. footballers
Turkish footballers
Association football defenders
Footballers from Istanbul